Bryan Parry (born 13 July 1992) is a Welsh actor. He was raised in Conwy, in North Wales. He is best known for his roles as Jonesy in Kajaki, Louis McQueen in Hollyoaks and Aaron Livesy in Emmerdale.

Television work

He graduated at Italia Conti Academy of Theatre Arts in 2013 and was cast in the role of Aiden Russell in the UK television show Doctors.

His next role came soon after, as he was cast as Louis McQueen in Hollyoaks.

Parry's next television role came when he played the role of Freddie Preston, in series 2 of In the Flesh. His performance brought a lot of online positive comments via Twitter as Freddie had a very emotional ending.

He briefly portrayed an alternative Aaron Livesy in one episode of Emmerdale in December 2016.

Personal life

Parry lives in London. He moved from south from North Wales to attend Italia Conti Academy of Theatre Arts. Before that, Parry studied Performing Arts at Coleg Llandrillo in Rhos-On-Sea.

Filmography

Television

Film

Theatre

References

External links

1992 births
Living people
Alumni of the Italia Conti Academy of Theatre Arts